Ahmed Abdulhakim Ahmed Al-Sarori (born 9 August 1998) is a Yemeni footballer who plays as a forward for Yemeni club Suwaiq and the Yemen national team.

He made history as the first Yemeni to play in Brazil, when he represented Central-PE in the lower division of Brazil.

Career statistics

International
Scores and results list Yemen's goal tally first.

References

External links 
 

1998 births
Living people
Yemeni footballers
Yemen international footballers
Yemeni expatriate footballers
Association football forwards
Al-Ahli Club Sana'a players
Central Sport Club players
Al-Markhiya SC players
FC Silon Táborsko players
Suwaiq Club players
Yemeni League players
Campeonato Brasileiro Série D players
Qatari Second Division players
Oman Professional League players
Expatriate footballers in Brazil
Expatriate footballers in Qatar
Expatriate footballers in Oman
Expatriate footballers in the Czech Republic
Yemeni expatriate sportspeople in Brazil
Yemeni expatriate sportspeople in Qatar
Yemeni expatriate sportspeople in the Czech Republic
Yemeni expatriate sportspeople in Oman
2019 AFC Asian Cup players